ARO 10 was an off-road vehicle produced by ARO and manufactured in Romania. It shares auto-parts with Dacia 1300, from engine to front axle, and was inspired by the Renault Rodeo and Citroën Méhari.

The ARO 24 Series got a "little brother" in 1980, the ARO 10 Series.  While the ARO-24 can be classified as mid-size SUVs, the ARO 10 is about the size of a Jeep Wrangler.  It was produced in many body trims, equipped with seven different engines (both gas and Diesel), and came in both 4x2 and 4x4 versions. The ARO 10 was also sold as the Dacia Duster in the United Kingdom and Dacia 10 in some international markets. A model derived from the ARO 10, named ARO Spartana, was also produced starting 1997. The last evolution of ARO 10, produced from 1999, was called ARO 10 Super, had a slight design revamp and was built on ARO 24 Series chassis. The vehicle was available to many exports markets, and in the United Kingdom it was available as the Dacia Duster, up until 2006, when it was discontinued. The Duster name was later used on another SUV  that in some way replaced the previous model.

First generation (1980)
In addition to being sold as the "Dacia Duster" in the United Kingdom and a few other markets, the car received several different names in Italy: Local company Ali Ciemme (ACM) assembled the ARO 10 there in the 1980s and sold it as the "Aro Super Ischia" with the 1.4-liter Renault petrol engine license built by Dacia. When fitted with Volkswagen's 1.6-liter petrol or diesel engines it was sold as the Aro Enduro x4, from 1987 until 1989. A turbodiesel was presented at the end of 1988. Sales volumes of Italian-assembled cars were not very large, reaching 2500 examples in 1987 and 1800 cars in 1988. Volkswagen-engined cars had 28 percent Romanian parts content, with the remainder being Italian and German. The Volkswagen-engined versions also received a stronger differential, to handle the additional torque.

Engines

Spartana

Versions

Sport Utility Vehicles
 ARO 10.1 2-door Convertible
 ARO 10.4 3-door
 ARO 10 Spartana
 ARO 11.4 5-door

Light Commercial Vehicles
 ARO 10.6 Regular Cab Pick-up
 ARO 11.9 Double Cab Pick-up

Other Versions: 10.0, 10.2, 10.3, 10.5, 10.9.

Gallery

See also
 ARO M461
 ARO 24 Series
 Dacia Duster

References

External links

 ARO
 ACM Off history (Spanish)

10
Cars of Romania
Off-road vehicles
Mini sport utility vehicles
All-wheel-drive vehicles
1980s cars
1990s cars
2000s cars
Vehicles introduced in 1980